Asianism may refer to

Asiatic style
Pan-Asianism